Binyamin Ze'ev Kahane (‎ 3 October 1966 – 31 December 2000) was an Israeli Orthodox rabbi and the son of Rabbi Meir Kahane.

Born in New York City, he emigrated to Israel with his family at the age of four, in 1971. He was a young Israeli Orthodox Jewish scholar and rabbi who was most famous for his leadership of Kahane Chai, a far-right political party that broke from his father's Kach party after Meir Kahane's assassination in 1990. He was convicted several times by Israeli courts for advocating violence against Arabs.

Kahane was the author of The Haggada of the Jewish Idea, a commentary based on his father's teachings of the Passover Haggadah read at the Passover Seder. He wrote a Torah portion sheet called Darka Shel Torah ("The Way of the Torah") that was distributed for the weekly Torah portions.

He and his wife Talia were shot and killed near the Israeli settlement of Ofra on 31 December 2000. Five of the couple's six children were in the van when they were hit by automatic rifle fire. Binyamin (the driver) was killed, and the vehicle went out of control and smashed into a wall. His wife Talia died in the ambulance on the way to the hospital in Jerusalem. The Prime Minister's Office subsequently announced the arrest of three members of Force 17 – Talal Ghassan, Marzouk Abu Naim, and Na'man Nofel – who were believed to have carried out the attack under the instruction of PLO leader Col. Mahmoud Damra. However, in 2007, Khaled Shawish was arrested for the attack.

See also
Kfar Tapuach
Kahanism
Yeshivat HaRaayon HaYehudi

References

External links
FAS Intelligence Resource Program entry for Kach and Kahane Chai
MySpace page for Binyamin Zeev Kahane

1966 births
2000 deaths
Deaths by firearm in the West Bank
Israeli casualties in the Second Intifada
Leaders of political parties in Israel
Israeli Orthodox Jews
Israeli Kahanists
Israeli Orthodox rabbis
Religious Zionist Orthodox rabbis
American emigrants to Israel
Israeli murder victims
Terrorism deaths in the West Bank
People murdered in the Palestinian territories
Kach and Kahane Chai politicians
Israeli terrorism victims
Assassinated Israeli politicians
Assassinated rabbis